Michael Garrett Shanks (born December 15, 1970) is a Canadian actor, writer and director. He is best known for his role as Daniel Jackson in the long-running  military science fiction television series Stargate SG-1 and as Charles Harris in the Canadian medical drama Saving Hope. He is also known for his work on low budget, genre work filmed in Canada.

Early life

Shanks was born in Vancouver, British Columbia, and grew up in Kamloops. He attended the University of British Columbia and was in the BFA Acting Program from 1990 to 1994. He later appeared in several stage productions while serving a two-year apprenticeship with the prestigious Stratford Festival in Ontario. His television career began with guest appearances on shows including Highlander and University Hospital. Parts in the television movies A Family Divided and The Call of the Wild preceded his casting in his breakthrough role as Daniel Jackson in Stargate SG-1.

Career

Stargate franchise 
Shanks played archaeologist Dr. Daniel Jackson throughout the first five seasons of Stargate SG-1 before leaving the show at the end of its fifth season, citing creative differences concerning the under-use of his character and the direction of the show as a whole. He made several guest appearances throughout the sixth season playing his own character, as well as voicing the Asgard character Thor. Shanks returned for the seventh and subsequent seasons, winning the Leo Award for Best Lead Performance By A Male in a Dramatic Series in 2004 for the seventh season episode "Lifeboat". During the series' tenth and final season, he signed up for 16 of the 20 episodes, taking some time off in March 2006 for the birth of his third child (second with wife and occasional co-star Lexa Doig).

He appeared in both direct-to-DVD Stargate films released in 2008, Stargate: The Ark of Truth and Stargate: Continuum, and won the 2009 Leo Award for Lead Performance by a Male in a Feature Length Drama for Continuum.

In 2004, Shanks made a crossover appearance (as Daniel Jackson) in the Stargate Atlantis pilot, "Rising". He also appeared in the tenth and eleventh episodes of Atlantis fifth and final season, and made a cameo appearance in the pilot of the third Stargate series Stargate Universe. He also appeared in the episodes "Human" and "Subversion".

Other appearances
In 2001, Shanks guest starred in the episode "Star-Crossed" in the Sci-Fi series Andromeda, during which he met his future wife, Lexa Doig. Coincidentally, they played two androids who fell in love with each other. In 2002, Shanks starred in the German/UK/South African co-production Sumuru, a science fiction B-movie, as astronaut Adam Wade. He also auditioned for the role of Shinzon in Star Trek: Nemesis.

In 2007, Shanks joined the Fox Network series 24, guest-starring as lobbyist Mark Bishop in a three-episode arc for season 6. In 2008–2009, Shanks had a recurring role on the second season of the USA Network spy series Burn Notice, playing Victor Stecker-Epps, a fellow burned spy and maniacal counterpoint to series lead Jeffrey Donovan's character. In 2008, Shanks had a guest starring role in one episode of the SciFi Channel series Eureka, as an alchemist somewhat responsible for the near destruction of the town due to a student's mixing chemicals in his lab and thereby creating the "Alchemist curse". He appeared in the episode "All That Glitters...", with a mention of his character in the episode "A Night At Global Dynamics".

Shanks was featured in a lead role in the SciFi Channel's adventure film, The Lost Treasure of the Grand Canyon as Jacob Thain opposite Beverly Hills, 90210 and Charmed alumna Shannen Doherty. The film premiered on the cable network on December 20, 2008. In 2010, Shanks appeared in an episode of Sanctuary, which stars fellow Stargate actor Amanda Tapping. In the same year he starred in the film Arctic Blast, a disaster film, as physicist Jack Tate.

Shanks' latest television guest roles were as archaeologist Carter Hall, DC Comics' superhero Hawkman, in the Smallville episode "Absolute Justice". He later reprised the role in the final episode of the ninth season.

Shanks then in guest spots during the tenth season episodes "Shield" and "Icarus" as well as appearing in Supernatural season 5 episode "99 Problems".

Shanks stars in the Canadian thriller Faces in the Crowd.

Shanks has also starred in the Fox comedy The Good Guys as the pompous leader of the Strike Force. In 2011, Shanks was the guest star in the third episode of the Showcase show Endgame, where he plays an amnesiac.

In 2012, Shanks returned to primetime as Charles "Charlie" Harris on Saving Hope, reuniting with Stargate SG-1 and Smallville co-star Erica Durance.

In 2019, Shanks played the role of Horace Axley on the second season of the Netflix science-fiction series Altered Carbon.

Personal life
Shanks' eldest daughter, Tatiana Shanks, (b. Aug 10 1998) is from his relationship with model and actress Vaitiare Bandera, who portrayed Sha're, his character's wife on Stargate SG-1.

On August 2, 2003, Shanks married actress Lexa Doig, whom he met in 2001 while guest-starring on the series Andromeda. (They would also work together on Stargate SG-1, when Doig was cast as Dr. Carolyn Lam, a recurring character in seasons nine and ten). They have two children.

Shanks enjoys playing ice hockey, and once considered playing professionally. He was on the Stargate SG-1 hockey team, competing against the teams of other Vancouver-based productions such as Smallville, and also displayed his aptitude for the sport in the 2006 television film Under the Mistletoe, in which he played the part of a school hockey coach. This aptitude was also highlighted in his 2013 role as the title character in the television film Mr. Hockey: The Gordie Howe Story.

Filmography

Film

Television

Director

Writer

Video games

Theatre

Stratford Festival

University of British Columbia

Arts Club

References

External links

 Michael Shanks Online – The Official Michael Shanks Website

 Michael Shanks TV Guide Blog

1970 births
Canadian male film actors
Canadian male television actors
Canadian male voice actors
Living people
Male actors from Vancouver
University of British Columbia alumni